Jaanus is an Estonian masculine given name, a version of John.

People named Jaanus include:
Jaanus Karilaid (born 1977), Estonian politician
Jaanus Kuum (1964–1998), Estonian-Norwegian cyclist
Jaanus Männik (born 1951), Estonian politician 
Jaanus Marrandi (born 1963), Estonian politician
Jaanus Nõgisto (born 1956), Estonian director, producer, composer and guitarist
Jaanus Nõmmsalu (born 1981), Estonian volleyball player
Jaanus Orgulas (1927–2011), Estonian actor 
Jaanus Rahumägi (born 1963), Estonian businessman and politician
Jaanus Raidal (born 1963), Estonian politician
Jaanus Sirel (born 1975), Estonian footballer
Jaanus Tamkivi (born 1959), Estonian politician
Jaanus Teppan (born 1962) Estonian cross-country skier
Jaanus Uudmäe (born 1980), Estonian triple jumper
Jaanus Veensalu (born 1964), Estonian footballer

References

Estonian masculine given names